Mallory James Mahoney (born January 31, 2005) is an American teen actress, who is known for her roles as Destiny Baker on the Disney Channel series Bunk'd (2018–present), and Ainsley Riches on the Netflix series On My Block (2020).

Career 
Mahoney expressed an interest in acting at the age of 4, and later began acting in 2014, first appearing in a Chuck E. Cheese commercial. After appearing in a number of short films, she starred as Katy Cooper in the Disney Channel Original Movie Adventures in Babysitting in 2016, the remake of the 1987 film of the same name. In the same year, she had a recurring role as Megan on the Rooster Teeth drama series Day 5, and starred in the Lifetime drama film Heaven Sent.

In 2018, Mahoney began starring as Destiny Baker on the Disney Channel series Bunk'd. In the same year, she began appearing as Mally on the series Jamall & Gerald. In 2020, she starred as Ainsley Riches on the Netflix teen-drama series On My Block. She starred in the Netflix film The Sleepover.

Filmography

References

External links 
 

2005 births
Living people
Actresses from Fort Worth, Texas
American child actresses
21st-century American women